Greta Hayes may refer to:

 Secret (Greta Hayes), a fictional superheroine in the DC Comics universe
 Greta Hayes (field hockey) (born 1996), Australian field hockey player